Elections to the first congress of the Zionist trade union centre Histadrut were held in 1920 (the congress itself convened on December 4, 1920). In total 4433 of about 7000 Jewish workers in Palestine participated. The election was marred by irregularities, and the Jewish Socialist Workers Party (MPSI) protested against the 'fraudulent behaviour' of the dominant parties after the election.

Results

References

Histadrut
Histadrut
Trade union elections